Mohamed Hassan "Mido" (born March 28, 1985) is an Egyptian professional footballer who plays as a centre-forward for the Egyptian club Al Nasr. Hassan has scored more than 100 goals in Egyptian Second Division.

References

1985 births
Living people
Al Nasr SC (Egypt) players
Egyptian footballers
Association football forwards
Tersana SC players
Ittihad El Shorta SC players
Al Mokawloon Al Arab SC players
Egyptian Premier League players